This is a list of civil parishes in the ceremonial county of the City of London.

Since the mid-20th century there have been no civil parishes in the City of London (it is secularly unparished). The law created in the 19th century has been reinstated to London boroughs in the 21st century which allows the creation of civil parishes, but the 20th century prohibition of these continues to apply to the City of London.

The City of London formed a single civil parish from 1907, until it was abolished on 1 April 1965.

List of parishes prior to 1907
The parishes abolished in 1907 (with the exception of the Inner and Middle Temples) were as follows (other parishes that existed previously but were amalgamated are noted):

Allhallows Barking 
Allhallows Bread Street
Allhallows Honey Lane
Allhallows Lombard Street
Allhallows London Wall
Absorbed St Augustine on the Wall 1441
Allhallows Staining
Allhallows the Great
Allhallows the Less
Bridewell Precinct
Extra-parochial place, civil parish from 1858.
Christchurch Newgate Street
Formed 1547 by union of abolished parishes St Audoen, St Nicholas Shambles
Holy Trinity the Less
Inner Temple
Extra-parochial place. Still extant. 
Middle Temple
Extra-parochial place. Still extant. 
St Alban Wood Street
St Alphage Sion College (also known St Alphage London Wall)
St Andrew by the Wardrobe
St Andrew Holborn Below the Bars
Created 1723 from the part of the parish of St Andrew Holborn within the city. (remainder, in Middlesex became St Andrew Holborn Above Bars)
St Andrew Hubbard (also known as St Andrew Budge Row)
St Andrew Undershaft
Absorbed parish of St Mary Axe in 1562
St Anne and St Agnes Aldersgate 
St Anne Blackfriars
St Antholin
St Augustine (also known as St Augustine Watling Street)
St Bartholomew by the Royal Exchange
St Bartholomew the Great (also known as St Bartholomew West Smithfield)
Parish formed 1544, previously extra-parochial precinct of Priory.
St Bartholomew the Less
Parish formed 1547, previously extra-parochial area occupied by St Bartholomew's Hospital
St Benet Fink
St Benet Gracechurch
St Benet Paul's Wharf
St Benet Sherehog
St Botolph by Billingsgate
St Botolph Without Aldersgate
Included Liberty of Glasshouse Yard in Middlesex until 1899
St Botolph Without Aldgate
St Botolph Without Bishopsgate
St Bride
St Christopher le Stocks
St Clement Eastcheap
St Dionis Backchurch
St Dunstan in the East
St Dunstan in the West
Included the Liberty of the Rolls in Middlesex until 1866
St Edmund the King and Martyr
St Ethelburga (also known as St Ethelburga Bishopsgate)
St Faith under St Paul's
St Gabriel Fenchurch Street
Originally All Hallows Fenchurch
St George Botolph Lane
St Giles Without Cripplegate
Included an area in Middlesex until 1723 when it was constituted as separate parish of St Luke's
St Gregory by St Paul
St Helen Bishopsgate
St James Duke's Place
Formed 1622/23 from part of St Katherine Cree
St James Garlickhithe
St John the Baptist upon Walbrook
St John the Evangelist Friday Street
Originally St Werburga 
St John Zachary
St Katherine Coleman
Originally All Hallows Coleman
St Katherine Cree
St Lawrence Jewry
St Lawrence Pountney
St Leonard Eastcheap
St Leonard Foster Lane 
St Magnus the Martyr
St Margaret Lothbury
St Margaret Moses
St Margaret New Fish Street
St Margaret Pattens
St Martin Ludgate
St Martin Orgar
St Martin Outwich
St Martin Pomeroy
St Martin Vintry
St Mary Abchurch
St Mary Aldermanbury
St Mary Aldermary
St Mary at Hill
St Mary Axe
Absorbed by St Andrew Undershaft 1562
St Mary Bothaw
St Mary Colechurch
St Mary le Bow
St Mary Magdalene Milk Street
St Mary Magdalene Old Fish Street
St Mary Mounthaw
St Mary Somerset
St Mary Staining
St Mary Woolchurch Haw
St Mary Woolnoth
St Matthew Friday Street
St Michael Bassishaw
St Michael Cornhill
St Michael Crooked Lane
St Michael le Querne
St Michael Paternoster Royal
St Michael Queenhithe
St Michael Wood Street
St Mildred Bread Street
St Mildred Poultry
St Nicholas Acons
St Nicholas Cole Abbey
St Nicholas Olave
St Nicholas Shambles
Formed part of new parish of Christchurch Newgate Street 1547
St Olave Hart Street
St Olave Old Jewry
St Olave Silver Street
St Pancras Soper Lane
St Peter Cornhill
St Peter le Poer
St Peter Paul's Wharf
St Peter Westcheap
St Sepulchre Without Newgate
St Stephen Coleman Street
St Stephen Walbrook
St Swithin London Stone
St Thomas Apostle
St Vedast Foster Lane
Serjeants' Inn Fleet Street
Extra-parochial place, civil parish from 1858.
Thavies Inn
Extra-parochial place, civil parish from 1858.
Whitefriars Precinct
Extra-parochial place, civil parish from 1858.

Map
A map showing the civil parish borders as they were in 1870.

Southwark
During the period the Borough of Southwark was considered to be part of the City of London it included the parishes of St George, St Olave, St Saviour and St Thomas.

Bills of mortality
All the parishes in the City of London were included in the regular weekly Bills of mortality that commenced in 1603, except St James Duke's Place which was added in 1626.

See also
List of churches in the City of London
Wards of the City of London

Notes

References
Notes

Bibliography

External links
 Office for National Statistics : Geographical Area Listings

Civil parishes
Local government in London
City of London
 City of London
Bills of mortality parishes